The men's discus throw event at the 2011 All-Africa Games took place on 11 September at the Estádio Nacional do Zimpeto.

Medalists

Records 
Prior to this competition, the existing world, African record and world leading were as follows:

Results

References

External links

Discus Throw